Julián Terán Susel, also listed as Recurvon or Recurbon Terán, (1895 – death date unknown) was a Cuban baseball infielder in the Cuban League and Negro leagues. He played several clubs from 1911 to 1924, mostly playing with the Cuban Stars (East).

References

External links
 and Baseball-Reference Black Baseball stats and Seamheads

San Francisco Park players
Cuban Stars (East) players
Cuban Stars (West) players
Philadelphia Giants players
Bacharach Giants players
Marianao players
1895 births
Year of death missing
Baseball infielders
Baseball players from Havana